Jennifer Harris is a former player of the Pennsylvania State University Lady Lions basketball team.

High school
Harris played for Central Dauphin High School in Harrisburg, Pennsylvania, where she was named a WBCA All-American. She participated in the 2003 WBCA High School All-America Game where she scored two points.

College
In 2006, she accused Rene Portland the coach of Lady Lions of removing her from the team because of her perceived sexual orientation.  Harris filed federal lawsuit against Portland, the University athletic director Timothy Curley, and the University.  An internal University review found that Portland created a "hostile, intimidating, and offensive environment" based on Harris's perceived sexual orientation. Portland was fined $10,000, required to attend diversity training sessions,  and placed on "zero tolerance" for future violations of the nondiscrimination policy.   The lawsuit was settled under confidential terms, and described by a joint statement as "amicable." 
Jennifer Harris graduated from James Madison University in 2008. Due to a career ending ankle injury, she was unable to pursue her dream to play in the WNBA. The affair including testimonies by other Lions players was covered in a multiple award-winning 2009 documentary film titled Training Rules directed by Dee Mosbacher and Fawn Yacker.

Penn State statistics

Source

References

Living people
American women's basketball players
James Madison University alumni
McDonald's High School All-Americans
Parade High School All-Americans (girls' basketball)
Penn State Lady Lions basketball players
People from State College, Pennsylvania
Shooting guards
Year of birth missing (living people)